The 2012 Rutgers Scarlet Knights football team represented  Rutgers University  in the 2012 NCAA Division I FBS football season.  The Scarlet Knights played their home games at High Point Solutions Stadium in Piscataway, NJ as a member of the Big East Conference. This was the first season with Kyle Flood as the head coach, as former head coach Greg Schiano accepted the head coaching position for the Tampa Bay Buccaneers. They finished the season 9–4, 5–2 in Big East play to win the school's first ever Big East Conference football championship, sharing the conference title with Cincinnati, Louisville, and Syracuse. They were invited to the Russell Athletic Bowl where they were defeated by Virginia Tech in overtime.

Schedule

Rankings

References

Rutgers
Rutgers Scarlet Knights football seasons
Big East Conference football champion seasons
Rutgers Scarlet Knights football